Members of the sixth and current Cabinet of Cambodia were sworn in on 9 September 2018. This is the fifth Cabinet of Hun Sen, who has led the government as sole Prime Minister since 1998. All of the Cabinet ministers are from the ruling Cambodian People's Party.

Members of the Cabinet are nominated by the Prime Minister and formally appointed by the King of Cambodia.

See also
Prime Minister of Cambodia
King of Cambodia

References

External links

Hun Sen
Politics of Cambodia
Government of Cambodia
2018 establishments in Cambodia
Cabinets established in 2018
Hun